Shontz is a surname. Notable people with the surname include:

Orfa Jean Shontz (1876–1954), American attorney and judge
Patricia Shontz (1933–1998), American economist, columnist, businesswoman, and academic

See also
Shonte